Boshwe Airport  is an airport serving Boshwe, Democratic Republic of the Congo.

References

Airports in Mai-Ndombe Province